Still Pond is a census-designated place in Kent County, Maryland, United States. Still Pond is located at the intersection of Maryland routes 292 and 566 on Still Pond Neck, south-southeast of Betterton and north of Chestertown. Much of the community is included in the Still Pond Historic District and it is notable as the first place in Maryland in which women gained the right to vote.

In addition to the Still Pond Historic District, the George Harper Store, Hebron, and Shepherd's Delight are listed on the National Register of Historic Places.

Still Pond, formerly an unincorporated community without a census-designated place, received one for the 2020 Census listing a population of 131.

Education
It is in the Kent County Public Schools. Kent County Middle School is in Chestertown, and Kent County High School is in an unincorporated area, in the Butlertown census-designated place with a Worton postal address.

The community was formerly assigned to Worton Elementary School. In 2017 the school board voted to close Worton Elementary.

Demographics

2020 census

Note: the US Census treats Hispanic/Latino as an ethnic category. This table excludes Latinos from the racial categories and assigns them to a separate category. Hispanics/Latinos can be of any race.

Notable people
Ryan Grim (born 1978), journalist, author, and co-founder of Strong Arm Press.
George Hepbron (1863–1946) wrote basketball's first book titled How to Play Basketball.

References

External links 

Map of Still Pond, from the Historical Society of Kent County collection

                                                                                                                    -->

Census-designated places in Kent County, Maryland
Census-designated places in Maryland